Jan Pearson (born 12 April 1959) is an English actress, known for her roles as Kath Fox in the BBC medical drama Holby City and Karen Hollins in the BBC soap opera Doctors, which she joined in February 2009. In 2010, Pearson won the award for Best On-Screen Partnership with Chris Walker at the British Soap Awards.

Career
Before acting, Pearson worked in the Royal Exchange pub on Enville Street in Wollaston, Stourbridge. Pearson made her acting debut in an episode of The Chief. She has also played Ann Davis in The Bill, Kath Fox in Holby City and Heather Deans in Silent Witness. Pearson has also appeared in films such as Martha, Meet Frank, Daniel and Laurence and Terror! Robespierre and the French Revolution.

Since 23 February 2009, Pearson has portrayed the role of receptionist Karen Hollins in the BBC soap opera Doctors. At the 2010 British Soap Awards, Pearson and Chris Walker, who plays her on-screen husband Rob Hollins, won the award for Best On-Screen Partnership. In 2012, Pearson was nominated for Best Comedy Performance. Pearson has since been nominated for the British Soap Award for Best Actress and [[Best Leading Performer.

Filmography

Awards and nominations

References

External links
 

1959 births
English soap opera actresses
English television actresses
Living people
Actresses from the West Midlands (county)